Ali Ahusan Ihusan (born 3 June 1986, Male', Maldives) is a Maldivian Journalist, a self-employed web designer and the owner of Islamic publications; Dhiislam Magazine and Dhiislam Online news. He also was a member of Maldives Media Council from 2018 to 2020.

Ali Ahusan Ihusan is considered by many as one of the many elements who facilitated the coup of 7 February 2011 in the Maldives. He is also known for creating one of the promotional websites supporting the mass protest held on 23 December 2011 in Maldives which was supported by many Islamists of the Maldives. This mass protest played an important role in overthrowing President Mohamed Nasheed's Government on 7 February 2011. He was arrested for 24 hours by Maldives Police Service after the publication of the website which openly issued death threats to anyone who is against the doctrine of Islam (Islamic Fundamentalism) he followed. However, his lawyer, Mohamed Shaheem Ali Saeed, a Maldivian Islamic scholar facilitated his release. Maldives Police Service later stated that they wanted to clarify as to who instructed him to develop the website and as to who published the information on it.

In 2009 he created an Islamic fundamentalist online blog called Dhiislam and it later became a registered online news website for Islamic news. In 2011 he started to print a magazine spreading fundamentalist and extremist doctrine of Islam by the name of Dhiislam. Moreover, he is responsible for publishing the weekly Islamist magazine Hidhaayathuge Ali for which he received funding during the term of his lawyer, Mohamed Shaheem Ali Saeed, as the minister of Islamic Affairs.

References

External links
dhiislam.com
ahusan.com

1986 births
Living people
People from Malé
Terrorist attacks on airports